The 1990 FA Charity Shield (also known as the Tennent's FA Charity Shield for sponsorship reasons) was the 68th Charity Shield, a football match contested by the winners of the previous season's Football League and FA Cup competitions. The match was played on 18 August 1990 between 1989–90 Football League champions Liverpool and 1989–90 FA Cup winners Manchester United. 

Utility player Clayton Blackmore opened the scoring for United in the first half, but a John Barnes penalty kick drew Liverpool level shortly after the break. The match finished at 1–1 and the two sides shared the trophy for six months each.

Absent from the game for Manchester United were captain Bryan Robson, who would be out of action until December that year due to injury; left-back Lee Martin who scored the winning goal in the FA Cup Final three months previously; and midfielder Neil Webb. Their places in the starting XI were taken by Clayton Blackmore, Mal Donaghy and newly signed full-back Denis Irwin, beginning a 12-year spell with the club that would reap numerous honours, while Paul Ince moved back into his usual midfield position.

Match details

References

External links
Match report at LFCHistory.net 

1990
Charity Shield 1990
Charity Shield 1990
Comm